Mathis James Reed (September 6, 1925 – August 29, 1976) was an American blues musician and songwriter. His particular style of electric blues was popular with blues as well as non-blues audiences. Reed's songs such as  "Honest I Do" (1957), "Baby What You Want Me to Do" (1960), "Big Boss Man" (1961), and "Bright Lights, Big City" (1961) appeared on both Billboard magazine's rhythm and blues and Hot 100 singles charts.

Reed influenced other musicians, such as Elvis Presley, Hank Williams Jr., and the Rolling Stones, who recorded his songs.  Music critic Cub Koda describes him as "perhaps the most influential bluesman of all," due to his easily accessible style.

Biography
Reed was born in Dunleith, Mississippi, United States.  He learned the harmonica and guitar from his friend Eddie Taylor. After several years of busking and performing there, he moved to Chicago, Illinois, in 1943. He was then drafted into the U.S. Navy and served in World War II. He was discharged in 1945 and returned briefly to Mississippi, marrying his girlfriend, Mary (henceforth known as Mama Reed). He then moved to Gary, Indiana, to work at an Armour meat-packing plant. Mama Reed was an uncredited background singer on many of his recordings, notably the hits "Baby What You Want Me to Do", "Big Boss Man" and "Bright Lights, Big City".

By the 1950s, Reed had established himself as a popular musician. He joined the Gary Kings with John Brim and played on the street with Willie Joe Duncan. Reed failed to gain a recording contract with Chess Records, but signed with Vee-Jay Records through Brim's drummer, Albert King. At Vee-Jay, Reed began playing again with Eddie Taylor and soon released "You Don't Have to Go", his first hit record. It was followed by a long string of hit songs.

Reed maintained his reputation despite his rampant alcoholism; his wife sometimes had to help him remember the lyrics to his songs while recording. In 1957, Reed developed epilepsy, though the condition was not correctly diagnosed for a long time, as Reed and doctors assumed it was delirium tremens. When Vee-Jay Records closed, his manager signed a contract with the fledgling ABC-Bluesway label, but Reed never produced another hit.  In 1968, he toured Europe with the American Folk Blues Festival.

Reed died of respiratory failure in 1976, in Oakland, California, eight days short of his 51st birthday. He is interred in the Lincoln Cemetery, in Blue Island, Illinois.  Reed was posthumously inducted into the Blues Hall of Fame in 1980, and the Rock and Roll Hall of Fame in 1991.

Influence
The Rolling Stones have cited Reed as a major influence on their sound, and their early set lists included Reed's songs "Ain't That Lovin' You Baby", "The Sun Is Shining" (played by the Stones at the 1969 Altamont concert), "Bright Lights, Big City", and "Shame, Shame, Shame". "Little by Little", the B-side of their February 1964 UK hit single "Not Fade Away" was a pastiche of "Shame, Shame, Shame". "Honest I Do" was included on their first album, The Rolling Stones (subtitled England's Newest Hit Makers in America), in 1964 (the U.S. edition also included "Little by Little"). For their 2016 release, Blue & Lonesome, they recorded a version of Reed's "Little Rain".

The Yardbirds recorded "I Ain't Got You" for the B-side of their second single "Good Morning Little Schoolgirl" with guitarist Eric Clapton.  With Jeff Beck, they recorded the Reed-inspired instrumental "Like Jimmy Reed Again", which was released on a reissue of their album Having a Rave Up.  The Animals considered Reed one of their main sources of inspiration and recorded versions of "I Ain't Got You" and "Bright Lights, Big City".  Van Morrison's group Them covered "Bright Lights, Big City" and "Baby, What You Want Me to Do", both of which are on the album The Story of Them Featuring Van Morrison.  "Big Boss Man", sung by Ron "Pigpen" McKernan, was regularly performed by the Grateful Dead in the 1960s and early 1970s and appears on their live album Grateful Dead

Elvis Presley recorded several of Reed's songs, having a hit with "Big Boss Man" in 1967 and recording several performances of "Baby, What You Want Me to Do" for his 1968 TV program. (Presley's 1964 hit "Ain't That Lovin' You Baby" is a different song from that recorded by Reed.) "Baby, What You Want Me to Do" was also covered by Wishbone Ash on their 1972 album Live Dates. Johnny and Edgar Winter performed it live in 1975 and included it on their album Together.  Omar Kent Dykes and Jimmie Vaughan released the album On the Jimmy Reed Highway as a tribute to Reed.  Bill Cosby covered four of Reed's songs, "Bright Lights, Big City", "Big Boss Man", "Hush Hush" and "Aw Shucks, Hush Your Mouth", for his 1967 album, Silver Throat: Bill Cosby Sings.

The Steve Miller Band covered five of Reed's songs: "You're So Fine", on the 1968 album Sailor, and "I Wanna Be Loved (But by Only You)", "Big Boss Man", "Caress Me Baby" and "Ain't That Lovin' You Baby", on the 1986 album Living in the 20th Century.

Bob Dylan paid tribute to Reed with the song "Goodbye Jimmy Reed" on his 2020 album Rough and Rowdy Ways.

Discography

Singles

Selected albums

See also
Blues harp
List of blues musicians
List of people from Mississippi
List of people with epilepsy

References

External links
 Webpage with detailed biography and photographs
 Illustrated Jimmy Reed discography

1925 births
1976 deaths
American blues singers
American blues guitarists
Guitarists from Indiana
Guitarists from Mississippi
Blues revival musicians
American street performers
Electric blues musicians
Harmonica blues musicians
Musicians from Gary, Indiana
People from Washington County, Mississippi
Military personnel from Mississippi
People with epilepsy
Vee-Jay Records artists
Deaths from respiratory failure
Writers from Gary, Indiana
American blues harmonica players
20th-century American guitarists
American male guitarists
United States Navy personnel of World War II
United States Navy sailors
African-American guitarists
20th-century African-American male singers
African-American United States Navy personnel
African Americans in World War II
Singers from Indiana
Singers from Mississippi